Bragg Creek is a hamlet in southern Alberta under the jurisdiction of Rocky View County in Division No. 6.

Bragg Creek is popular for shopping, with its shops, restaurants, and mountain scenery. The area has many hiking/biking, cross-country and equestrian trails and picnic/camping areas. It has been the location of several movies and TV series.

Amenities 

Bragg Creek is popular for shopping, with its quaint shops, restaurants, and mountain scenery.

The area is a popular spot for vacations and short day trips from Calgary. It is near the Rocky Mountains and Kananaskis Country. The Elbow River and the scenic Elbow Falls are a short distance away.

There are many recreational areas in the area. These include Bragg Creek Provincial Park and the Canyon Creek Ice Cave, also known as the Bragg Creek Ice Cave. There are numerous hiking/biking trails, equestrian trails and picnic/camping areas. Downhill skiing used to be popular, although since the abandonment of the nearby downhill ski centre, Wintergeen, only cross country skiing facilities are available.

Many summer camps, such as OLQP, Easter Seals Camp Horizon and Kamp Kiwanis are also near Bragg Creek.

The powderface42, a marathon and half-marathon takes place in the vicinity every year. A mountain marathon is an event that combines the distance and endurance of a classical marathon with the challenging terrain of a mountain race. Unlike traditional mountain marathons in the UK, this event does not require participants to navigate through the course. Instead, the route is clearly marked and there are water stations along the way. It is similar to a traditional marathon running race in that respect.

History 
Bragg Creek is named after Albert Warren Bragg from Collingwood, Nova Scotia and his 14-year-old brother John Thomas who homesteaded in the area in 1894. The community was established between a forestry reserve, the Sarcee First Nations reserve and a Provincial Park. Ranching was the original primary economic generator in Bragg Creek. The economy diversified with the emergence of recreation in the 1920s.

Lyon Mountain Ski Hill was a small resort located in Alberta, Canada. It opened in 1982 and was named after its builder, Bob Lyon. The resort featured four lifts and 11 runs, most of which were classified as easy or intermediate in difficulty. It was popular with families due to its close proximity to Calgary. In 2003, the resort was closed by its owner at the time, Resorts of the Canadian Rockies (RCR). This decision was made due to a combination of factors, including poor snow conditions, aging infrastructure, and a lack of potential for reinvestment. RCR continues to operate the adjacent Wintergreen Golf and Country Club. Over time, most of the ski lifts at Lyon Mountain Ski Hill have been removed and sold. RCR has proposed a large housing development for the area, including single-family homes, villas, and a hotel.

Bragg Creek was featured in the feature films Storm (1987) and Killer Image (1992) both directed by David Winning, and also Betrayed (1988) directed by Costa-Gavras.  During the 1990s, CBC aired the television program North of 60, which was mainly filmed in Bragg Creek.  The town was the filming location for the BBC/Discovery Channel series Dinosapien (2007) and the 2009 CBC Television series Wild Roses, as well as portions of the movie FUBAR.

2013 flooding 
The majority of Bragg Creek buildings were damaged in this event, as were the majority of houses in nearby Redwood Meadows. The voluntary evacuation was not met with widespread co-operation, as many residents stayed to battle the flood by building makeshift dams. Bragg Creek has since recovered from the event.

Demographics 

The population of Bragg Creek according to the 2018 municipal census conducted by Rocky View County is 459.

See also 
 List of communities in Alberta
 List of designated places in Alberta
 List of hamlets in Alberta

References

External links 
 Bragg Creek - Guide to outdoor adventure in Kananaskis & Bragg Creek
 Hikes in Bragg Creek

Rocky View County
Hamlets in Alberta
Calgary Region
Designated places in Alberta